Diminution is a satirical technique. It reduces the size of something in order that it may be made to appear ludicrous, or in order to be closely examined. For example, if the Canadian Members of Parliament are portrayed as squabbling, spoiled little boys and girls, this would be diminution. A diminutive satire is Gulliver's Travels.

Satire